Marína Vasarmídou (Greek: Μαρίνα Βασαρμίδου; born 16 July 1972 in Ierapetra) is a retired Greek athlete who specialised in the sprinting events. She represented her country in the 4 × 100 metres relay at the 2004 Summer Olympics, as well as three World Championships.

Competition record

Personal bests
Outdoor
100 metres – 11.47 (-0.5 m/s) (Athens 2004)
200 metres – 23.43 (+0.2 m/s) (Rethymno 1999)
400 metres – 53.01 (Athens 2000)
Indoor
60 metres – 7.39 (Paiania 2004)
200 metres – 23.65 (Piraeus 2002)

References

1972 births
Living people
People from Ierapetra
Greek female sprinters
Olympic athletes of Greece
Athletes (track and field) at the 2004 Summer Olympics
World Athletics Championships athletes for Greece
Mediterranean Games silver medalists for Greece
Mediterranean Games medalists in athletics
Athletes (track and field) at the 1991 Mediterranean Games
Athletes (track and field) at the 1993 Mediterranean Games
Athletes (track and field) at the 1997 Mediterranean Games
Athletes (track and field) at the 2005 Mediterranean Games
Olympic female sprinters
Sportspeople from Crete